Ya Ding (born 1959) is a Chinese writer and translator.

He comes from a little village in North China and after his secondary studies he went working as a farmer thanks to Down to the Countryside Movement. After Cultural Revolution, he created the first University of Beijing student revue and started to translate French authors.

Awards
1988: Prix Cazes for Le Sorgho rouge.
1988: Prix de l'Asie for Le Sorgho rouge
1988: Prix de la Découverte du Pen Club français
1989: Prix de l'Été for Les Héritiers des sept royaumes.
1991: Prix Contrepoint for Le Jeu de l'eau et du feu

Publications
 1987 Le Sorgho rouge, novel
 1988 Les Héritiers des sept royaumes, novel
 1990 Le Jeu de l'eau et de feu, novel,
 1992 Le Cercle de petit ciel, novel
 1994 La Jeune Fille Tong, novel

References

1957 births
Living people
People's Republic of China translators
French–Chinese translators
20th-century Chinese translators
21st-century Chinese translators
French-language writers from China